John Flannery (born April 11, 1962) is an American professional golfer.

Flannery was born in Salinas, California. He attended the University of Southern California where he was an All American collegiate and turned pro in 1985.

Flannery was the leading money winner and Player of the Year on the Ben Hogan Tour during the 1992 season, where he had three victories. He played on the PGA Tour in 1993 and 1994.

Flannery retired from professional golf in 2001.

Professional wins (5)

Ben Hogan Tour wins (4)

Ben Hogan Tour playoff record (1–0)

Other wins (1)
1987 California State Open

Results in major championships

CUT = missed the half-way cut
"T" = tied
Note: Flannery only played in the U.S. Open.

Results in The Players Championship

CUT = missed the halfway cut

See also
1992 Ben Hogan Tour graduates
List of golfers with most Web.com Tour wins

External links

John Flannery - Yahoo! Sports

American male golfers
USC Trojans men's golfers
PGA Tour golfers
Korn Ferry Tour graduates
Golfers from California
Sportspeople from Salinas, California
1962 births
Living people